Martin's Mill Junior/Senior High School is a public secondary school located in the unincorporated community of Martin's Mill, Texas, USA and classified as a 2A school by the UIL.  It is a part of the Martin's Mill Independent School District located in southeastern Van Zandt County.   In 2015, the school was rated "Met Standard" by the Texas Education Agency.

Academics
UIL Academic Meet Champions 
2011(1A)

Team Titles
Current Issues and Events (team) - 2004, 2007 
Journalism (team) - 2011, 2013
Literary Criticism  (team) - 1998, 2000, 2004, 2005, 2007, 2008, 2009, 2011, 2012, 2013, 2014  
Spelling & Vocabulary (team) - 2009, 2011, 2012

Individual Titles
Computer Science (individual) - 2008   
Current Issues and Events (individual) - 2004, 2007 
Editorial Writing (individual) - 2011
Feature Writing (individual) - 2010
Journalism's "Tops in Texas" (individual) - 2010, 2011
Lincoln-Douglas Debate - 1993
Literary Criticism (individual) - 1995, 1997, 1998, 2003, 2004, 2007, 2010, 2012, 2013, 2014 
News Writing (individual) - 2013
Prose Interpretation (individual) - 2014
Science (Biology) (individual) - 2005

Athletics
The Martin's Mill Mustangs compete in these sports - 

Cross Country, Basketball, Golf, Tennis, Track, Baseball & Softball

State titles
Boys Basketball - 
1949(B)
Girls Basketball - 
2006(1A/D1), 2008(1A/D1), 2013(1A/D1), 2015(2A), 2018(2A), 2019(2A)
Girls Golf - 
2008(1A),

State Finalist
Boys Basketball - 
2007(1A)
Girls Basketball - 
2010(1A/D1), 2011(1A/D1), 2012(1A/D1)
Boys Golf (individual) - 2012
Boys Cross Country (individual) - 1998
Boys Track 3200 meter run (individual) - 1997, 1999

Notable alumni
Leon Black - Former head coach of the Texas Longhorns Basketball team and also coached at nearby Van High School. Black was a member of the first Mustang state championship team in 1949.

References

External links
Martin's Mill ISD website

Public high schools in Texas
Schools in Van Zandt County, Texas